The institut pour la Défense de la Démocratie (institute for the Defense of Democracy) is a French right-wing Think Tank.

External links
 

Political and economic think tanks based in France